The Ongwediva College of Education (OCE) was one of four pedagogical colleges in Namibia. It offered three-year undergraduate diploma courses in basic vocational education to elementary and high school teachers: the Basic Education Teacher Diploma (BETD).

The college was based in Ongwediva town, founded in 1913 by Finnish missionaries. In addition to teaching facilities, it also maintained a university library, a computer and arts centre and student residences.
Effective April 1, 2010, the college entered the Faculty of Education at the University of Namibia.

Notable alumni
 Johannes Nakwafila
 Mzee Kaukungwa
 Henock Kankoshi
 Marten Kapewasha
 Neshani Andreas

See also
 Education in Namibia
 List of schools in Namibia

References

Universities in Namibia
University of Namibia
Ongwediva
Educational institutions established in 1913
1913 establishments in German South West Africa